Robert Paddock is a South African entrepreneur and co-founder of GetSmarter. In 2017, he sold his stake in GetSmarter, which was acquired by 2U for $103 million. At the time it was one of the largest exits in the history of South African startups.

Following the sale of GetSmarter, Paddock launched an online High school, The Valenture Institute.

Early life
Paddock taught music in Cape Town, South Africa, before moving to London to help establish a startup.

Career
Paddock co-founded GetSmarter in 2008 as a South African startup. From the outset, GetSmarter aimed to offer short online courses in partnership with major Universities. It began with two educational partnerships in South Africa, one with Stellenbosch University and the other with University of Cape Town (UCT). Robert's brother and co-founder had designed a virtual campus prior to GetSmarter, which was used as the foundation for the online workshop component.

GetSmarter differed from a lot of other MOOC offerings at the time. Paddock pioneered online learning with high completion rates. According to Entrepreneur magazine, often MOOCs would have a completion rate between 3% to 15%. Paddock's tailored approach meant completion rates on GetSmarter were around 88% at the time of the interview.

The high completion rates were seen as a major selling point when Paddock and his brother began negotiations with major Universities outside South Africa. The first major deal was struck with Massachusetts Institute of Technology (MIT) in 2016, which began to offer online courses through GetSmarter.

By 2016, GetSmarter had revenue figures of $17 million and around 400 employees according to an article in Forbes. Later that year, it was rumoured that Paddock and his brother were speaking with NASDAQ-listed 2U about investment or a potential takeover.

In early 2017, GetSmarter was acquired by 2U for $103 million. it was said that initially there were no plans to sell the business by Paddock. Chip Paucek, founder of 2U got in touch with the Paddock brothers after seeing an online ad for GetSmarter on Facebook. Those discussions eventually became acquisition talks.

After exiting his position at GetSmarter, Paddock announced that he would be launching one of Africa's first online high schools, The Valenture Institute. Paddock explained in an interview with Ventureburn that the current education model doesn't fit the requirements of many talented young people. Athletes and those involved in arts, struggle to fit in all their academic needs throughout the day. Paddock believed that online Universities offered something different to MOOCs.

References

Living people
South African businesspeople
Year of birth missing (living people)